The Hamburg Sea Devils are an American football team in Hamburg, Germany, that plays in the European League of Football (ELF).

History 
The Hamburg franchise was announced in November 2020, as part of the inaugural season of the European League of Football. 
In March 2021, ELF announced it has reached an agreement with the NFL, to be able to use the team names from the days of NFL Europe. On the same day, it was announced Hamburg will use the name of the defunct NFL Europe franchise Hamburg Sea Devils. The Sea Devils also introduced their new head coach, former special teams coach for multiple NFL teams, Ted Daisher. However, he ended up being released only 3 weeks into the inaugural season, because of "different views and expectations regarding the philosophy and leadership of our team". He was replaced on an interim basis by offensive coordinator Andreas Nommensen.

Season-by-season

Stadium
The Sea Devils are playing their home games at the 11,000 capacity Stadion Hoheluft.

Roster

Staff

References

External links
 Official website

European League of Football teams
American football teams in Germany
Sport in Hamburg
Hamburg Sea Devils (ELF)
2021 establishments in Germany
American football teams established in 2021